Jon Øigarden (born 31 May 1971) is a Norwegian actor, who is well known for his role as journalist Peter Verås in the TV series Mammon, Jarl Varg in Norsemen, and other Norwegian films.

Career
Jon Øigarden was educated at the Norwegian National Academy of Theatre, and has acted both on stage and on screen. Between 1997 and 1999 he worked at Oslo Nye Teater. Among the plays he has acted in is Mirandolina by Carlo Goldoni and an adaptation of Graham Greene's Travels with My Aunt, and he has had roles in such movies as Detektor (2000) and the comedy Get Ready to Be Boyzvoiced (2000). Øigarden has been cast to portray the Norwegian war criminal Henry Rinnan on film; the filming was planned to start some time in 2009. For a while he both ran and acted in the theater Torshovteateret, with his colleagues Mads Ousdal and Trond Espen Seim.

Selected filmography
"1732 Høtten" (1998)
"Lyckliga gatan" (1999) (TV)
Sofies verden (1999)
Detektor (2000)
Get Ready to Be Boyzvoiced (2000)
Gymnaslærer Pedersen (2006)
Berlinerpoplene (2007) (TV)
A Somewhat Gentle Man (2010)
Norwegian Ninja (2010)
Fuck Up (2012)
In Order of Disappearance (2014)
Norsemen (TV series) (2016–2020)
22 July (2018)
Lords of Chaos (2018)
Wisting (TV series) (2019)

References

External links
 
  Biography at Snurrfilm
  Jon Øigarden at Oslo National Theatre

1971 births
Living people
Oslo National Academy of the Arts alumni
Norwegian male stage actors
Norwegian male film actors
Norwegian male television actors